Indicia is the plural of the Latin word indicium, meaning distinguishing marks.

In magazine and comic book publishing, indicia refers to a piece of text traditionally appearing on the first recto page after the cover, which usually contains the official name of the publication, its publication date, information regarding editorial governance of the publication, and a disclaimer regarding disposition of unsolicited submissions. Placement of indicia has moved away from being exclusively on the inside first recto page. Since 2006, American comic books commonly have indicia on the inside last verso page, while magazines may place their indicia almost anywhere within the publication (often on whichever page has the table of contents).

See also 
 Indicia (philately)
 Colophon
 Front matter
 Masthead (American publishing)

References

Comics terminology
Publishing